Kanu Gerd (also Romanized as Kanū Gerd; also known as Ganū Gerd, Kaneh Gerd, and Kano Gird) is a village in Tabadkan Rural District, in the Central District of Mashhad County, Razavi Khorasan Province, Iran. At the 2006 census, its population was 32, in 9 families.

References 

Populated places in Mashhad County